Rara National Park is a protected area in the Himalayas of Nepal and was established in 1976. The park was established to protect the unique flora and fauna of the Humla–Jumla Region of Nepal.

Rara National Park is managed by the Department of National Parks and Wildlife Conservation and protected with the assistance of the Nepal Army.

Climate
The climate of Rara National Park is pleasant during the summer, but becomes very cold during the winter, because of the altitude. The best times to visit the park are in September, October, April, and May. During the winter, temperatures drop below freezing, and many high passes become blocked by snow. The summer is warm, but June to August is monsoon season, making the trek to Rara National Park difficult.

Vegetation 
One thousand and seventy species of flora are estimated from Rara National Park. Rhododendron, fir, brown oak, and birch species are found in the sub-alpine region. Below , the vegetation consists of mainly blue pine (Pinus excelsa), rhododendron (Rhododendron arboretum), west Himalayan spruce, black juniper and Himalayan cypress. Above , the vegetation changes to a coniferous forest consisting of a mixture of fir, spruce and pine.

Fauna
Fifty-one species of mammals, 241 species of birds, two species of reptiles and amphibians, and three species of fish have been recorded from the park including musk deer, red panda, snow leopard, Himalayan black bear, Indian leopard, jackal, Himalayan tahr, yellow-throated marten, otter, dhole, gray langur, and rhesus macaque.

There are 241 recorded species of birds, including 49 wetland species. Coots are often found in the lake. During the winter, great-crested and black-necked grebes, red-crested pochards, mallard, common teal (Anas crecca), and common merganser are common. Other birds seen often include the Himalayan snowcock, chukar partridge, Himalayan monal, kalij pheasant and blood pheasant.

In 1979, three endemic snowtrout species were collected in Lake Rara and described as new species: the Nepalese snowtrout Schizothorax nepalensis, the Rara snowtrout, and Nepalese snowtrout. Also in 1979, the frog species Paa rarica has been first recorded as endemic to the lake.

Tourism
GORP founder Bill Greer described Rara Lake as:
"a shimmering blue jewel set in a ring of snowy peaks"

Another travel writer describes a trek in the park:
"Although more trampled than in the past, the road to Rara Lake is still without any of the comfortable services available along more popular trails. Logistically it is not an easy trek; it is hard to get to and from, and it is an organizational challenge, requiring informed guides and porters to tote the two weeks' worth of material that will keep you warm, dry and fed. It is also tough on the bones, involving several 11,000-foot passes. However, once you overcome the obstacles, the rewards are legion: few if any other trekkers, incomparable natural splendor, "untouched" villages, blissful quiet…"

Environmental issues 
Due to over-grazing and defecation, the national park conservation officers are facing a challenge to preserve the lake. Local people are found cutting timber wood and fuel wood, which is a problem for conservation of Rara. Also during festivals visitors and local people produce a lot of wastage causing water pollution.

Transport 

Even though the park does not have connection to the national road network, there are two ways to reach Rara National Park- airways and roadways. Roadways, it takes four days to reach Rara National Park from Kathmandu through the Karnali Highway and takes up to three days from the nearest town Jumla through means of trekking. From, Nepalgunj there is two ways to reach the lake, one is by following the salt route to Humla and another following a number of trails through Dolpo region. Through air, the nearest airport to the Rara National Park is Talcha Airport in Mugu and Jumla Airport in Jumla. There is no direct air service from Kathmandu to Mugu. Talcha can be reached from air only by getting down from Kathmandu to Nepalgunj or Surkhet.  Rara National Park is mainly served by Talcha Airport, which is 4 km east of the lake. Nepal Airlines, Sita Air, Summit Air,  and Tara Air operate flights to both Talcha Airport and Jumla Airport from Nepalgunj Airport. It takes approx. 3 hours to reach Rara National Park from Talcha Airport on foot. Apart from this, a public bus also runs from Surkhet to Mugu headquarter Gamgadhi.

References

External links

 Department of National Parks and Wildlife Conservation Nepal: Rara National Park

National parks of Nepal
1976 establishments in Nepal